Table Mountain is a mountain ridge located in the Diablo Range in Northern California on the boundary between Kings and Monterey counties. A large 500 kV power line, connected to Path 15, runs to the north of the summit. A little snow falls on the mountain during the winter.

See also 
 List of highest points in California by county

References 

Mountains of Kings County, California
Mountains of Monterey County, California
Diablo Range
Mountains of Northern California